Acrolepiopsis sinense is a moth of the family Acrolepiidae. It is found in China (Zhejiang).

References

Acrolepiidae
Moths described in 1971